Hermann Thyräus (b. at Neuss on the Rhine, 1532; d. at Mainz, 26 October 1591) was a German Jesuit theologian and preacher.

Life

He studied first at Cologne, and then, after 1522, at the Collegium Germanicum at Rome. On 26 May 1556, he was received into the Society of Jesus by Ignatius Loyola.

In the same year, Thyräus was made a professor of theology at Ingolstadt, where he taught for three years the "Magister sententiarum", and in the fourth year controversial theology. In 1560 he became a professor at Trier, and lectured on the Epistles of St. Paul. He was rector of the college at Trier (1565–70), provincial of the Jesuit province of the Rhine (1571-8), and from 1578 until his death rector of the college at Mainz. 

The archbishops of the Rhine often employed him in important matters. He was also a noted preacher. When he occupied the pulpit at Trier as many as 4000 people often came together to hear him.

Works

The Liber de religionis libertate, ascribed to him, was written most probably by his younger brother Peter, also a Jesuit. His Confessio Augustana, with controversial notes, appeared at Dillingen in 1567. He also left several volumes of sermons.

References

Attribution

1532 births
1591 deaths
16th-century German Jesuits
16th-century German Catholic theologians
Academic staff of the University of Ingolstadt